The Seniors (sometimes The Senior or simply Seniors) is a 1978 American comedy film about four college seniors who open a bogus sex clinic, which unexpectedly mushrooms into a multimillion-dollar business. Directed by Rod Amateau, the films features Dennis Quaid in one of his earliest roles and Alan Reed (the original voice of Fred Flintstone) in his final film appearance.

Plot 

The film opens with a title card that jokingly claims that Paul Newman, Robert Redford, Steve McQueen, Al Pacino, Burt Reynolds, Ryan O'Neal, Robert De Niro, Clint Eastwood, and Charles Bronson are the stars of the film. This is followed by a cartoon professor delivering the line "ooh all these big stars, not one of them is in the picture."

Ben (Gary Imhoff), Larry (Jeffrey Byron), Alan (Dennis Quaid) and Steve (Lou Richards) are college seniors who are terrified at the prospect of working for a living. They create a plan to support themselves as graduate research students by getting a foundation grant to study sexuality in college-age women.

Cast 
Gary Imhoff ... Ben
Jeffrey Byron ... Larry
Dennis Quaid ... Alan
Lou Richards ... Steve
Rocky Flintermann ... Arnold
Priscilla Barnes ... Sylvia
Alan Reed ... Professor Heigner

Release 
The film was released in 1978 with an MPAA rating of R.

External links

American sex comedy films
American independent films
1970s sex comedy films
Films scored by Patrick Williams
Films directed by Rod Amateau
1978 independent films
1970s English-language films
1970s American films